Nelson Ritsema (born 17 August 1994) is a Dutch rower. He competed in the 2020 Summer Olympics.

References

1994 births
Living people
Rowers from Amsterdam
Rowers at the 2020 Summer Olympics
Dutch male rowers
Olympic rowers of the Netherlands
21st-century Dutch people